Buxton (Midland) railway station served the town of Buxton, Derbyshire, England between 1863 and 1967.

History

The station was opened by the Midland Railway (MR) on 1 June 1863. It was adjacent to, and to the south-east of, the Buxton railway station of the Stockport, Disley and Whaley Bridge Railway, which opened two weeks later. The two stations had similar end walls incorporating a large fan-shaped window.

The station was the terminus of the MR route from Derby.

The station closed on 6 March 1967. Most of the station was subsequently demolished and the land used for a ring road. Part of the site including the trackbed of the tracks outside the station were occupied by the Buxton Steam Centre of the Peak Rail Heritage Railway in the 1970s who relaid track with ambitions to reopen the line towards Millers Dale. This plan failed and they moved their entire operations and stock to the section between Matlock, Darley Dale and Rowsley where they have successfully reopened the railway. In June 2019 Peak Rail announced that they hoped to recommence work on the Buxton site during the summer of 2019.

Notes

References

External links
Buxton Station on navigable 1947 O.S. map
History of Buxton Midland Railway Station
"Picture the Past" Midland railway station
"Picture the Past" Train in Ashwood Dale showing typical terrain for this line.

Disused railway stations in Derbyshire
Former Midland Railway stations
Railway stations in Great Britain opened in 1863
Railway stations in Great Britain closed in 1967
Beeching closures in England
Buildings and structures in Buxton